Verle Matthew Tiefenthaler (born July 11, 1937) is an American former professional baseball pitcher who appeared briefly in Major League Baseball as a member of the Chicago White Sox in .

Tiefenthaler is a native of Breda, Iowa. In 1955, he was signed by the New York Giants at age 17 and spent seven years in the Giants' farm system before he was sent to Chicago on August 17, 1962, as the "player to be named later" to complete a trade that had been made almost nine months before—on November 30, 1961—when the San Francisco Giants had obtained veteran left-hander Billy Pierce from the White Sox in a six-player transaction. Two days after his trade from the Giants, on August 19, Tiefenthaler made his MLB debut. In an afternoon game at Comiskey Park against the Detroit Tigers, Tiefenthaler relieved Dom Zanni (coincidentally, one of the players also involved in the Pierce trade) in the fourth inning and the bases loaded, with Detroit leading 2–1. Tiefenthaler got two quick outs, but he walked Chico Fernández to force in a run, then surrendered a grand slam home run to Bill Bruton. He then allowed a single to Al Kaline before, charged with two earned runs, he left the game with the White Sox down 7–1. He made two more appearances out of the Chisox' bullpen before the end of the 1962 campaign.

In the majors, Tiefenthaler had a 0–0 record, with a 9.82 earned run average, in three games and 3 innings pitched. He allowed six hits and seven bases on balls, recording one strikeout. He pitched at Triple-A for one more season, 1963, before leaving pro baseball.

References

External links

1937 births
Living people
Baseball players from Iowa
Chicago White Sox players
Corpus Christi Giants players
Danville Leafs players
Indianapolis Indians players
Major League Baseball pitchers
Muskogee Giants players
People from Carroll County, Iowa
Rio Grande Valley Giants players
Sioux City Soos players
Springfield Giants players
Tacoma Giants players